Porto Kagio or Porto Káyio (Πόρτο Κάγιο) is a seaside village in the East Mani municipality on the eastern side of the Mani Peninsula, Greece. It faces a small bay off the Laconian Gulf and is about three miles north of Cape Matapan, the southernmost tip of the Mani Peninsula and of mainland Greece.

History

The site was that of the ancient port of Psamathous, mentioned by Pausanias. The modern name comes from the Venetian Porto Quaglio and the French (Frankish) Port des Cailles (Quail Port).

Some 17th- and 18th-century maps called it "Maina", so some authors consider it to be a possible location for the castle of Grand Magne, but medieval portolans mention no such castle here.

The Ottomans built a castle here in about 1568, to protect the port, which was used for galleys patrolling the Kythera Channel. The Venetians attacked the castle in 1570, and the Ottomans surrendered and abandoned it. In 1670, the Ottomans returned and built a new castle. They were driven out in 1770 during the Orlov Revolt. Porto Kagio was the base of Lambros Katsonis's pirate fleet, and it was at Porto Kagio that it was finally destroyed. In World War II, Porto Kagio was a place where many British soldiers escaped to Egypt.

Description

Porto Kagio is a peaceful village whose main economy is tourism. It has 35 hotel rooms distributed on 4 different businesses.

Notes

Populated places in the Mani Peninsula
Populated places in Laconia